Kerry is a village and geographically large community in Montgomeryshire, Powys, Wales.

Kerry also has a parish church of Norman origins dedicated to St. Michael and All Angels, as well as a baptist church.

It gives its name to the Kerry Hill breed of sheep.

Governance
The large, rural Kerry community contains the villages of Kerry, Glanmule, Dolfor and Sarn. It is divided into three wards (Kerry, Dolfor and Sarn) and for Powys County Council the community is an electoral division/ward (called Kerry). It falls in the historic county of Montgomeryshire.

History
The Battle of Kerry was fought nearby in 1228 between Llywelyn Fawr and Hubert de Burgh.

The area around the village was the Welsh commote and Lordship of Ceri, part of the region of Rhwng Gwy a Hafren, and it was originally ruled by the Princes of Maelienydd and their descendants.

Kerry was the terminus of the Kerry Railway, later a branch of the Cambrian Railways, connecting it to Abermule that ceased operating in 1956. The narrow gauge Kerry Tramway brought timber from the forests to the main line station.

Population

St. Michael's Church

St. Michael's Church of Kerry is located within the diocese of St. Asaph and was rededicated in 1176; an earlier church is likely to have occupied the site previously. The parish is very large in comparison to others, stretching as far as Mochdre, Dolfor and Beguildy. It boasts one of only three chained Bibles in Wales, possibly even in the United Kingdom, and is printed according to William Morgan's Welsh translation.

Dolforgan Hall 

Dolforgan Hall and estate, was located just outside Kerry. From 1868 to 1883, it was the home of inventor and industrialist James Walton. In 1894, it was purchased by John William Willans, the chief engineer of the Liverpool Overhead Railway, and passed to his son, philanthropist John Bancroft Willans.

Kerry Hill sheep
Kerry was noted for its local breed of sheep and the large sheep fairs that were held in the village. Kerry Hill sheep have a distinctive and unique coloration, with a white face bearing black markings around the mouth, ears, and eyes.

See also
 Cilthriew, Kerry. Timber-Framed farmhouse. 
 Upper Pengelli, Kerry. Victorian Model Farm 
 Kerry Hill sheep
 J W Poundley and D Walker. Architects and Land Surveyors of Black Hall, Kerry.

References

External links

Kerry Community Council website
Photos of Kerry and surrounding area on geograph.org.uk
Kerry Baptist Church

Villages in Powys
Communities in Powys
Commotes
Dolforgan Estate